This is a list of all schools, both current and closed schools in South Australia.

Aboriginal Schools, operated by the South Australian Government

Aboriginal early learning centres and kindergartens 
 Kalaya Children's Centre
 Kaurna Plains, Elizabeth

Anangu Schools 
Schools located in Anangu Pitjantjatjara Yankunytjatjara, Maralinga Tjarutja and Yalata in the far west of South Australia where Aboriginal people refer to themselves as Anangu:
 Amata Anangu School
 Ernabella Anangu School
 Fregon Anangu School 
 Indulkana Anangu School 
 Kenmore Park Anangu School
 Mimili Anangu School
 Murputja Anangu School 
 Oak Valley Anunga School 
 Pipalyatjara Anangu School 
 Yalata Anangu School

Other Aboriginal Schools 
 Carlton Primary School, Port Augusta
 Kaurna Plains School, Elizabeth 
 Koonibba Aboriginal School, near Ceduna
 Marree Aboriginal School
 Oodnadatta Aboriginal School

Government Primary Schools 
Primary Schools (R–6), operated by the South Australian government. From 2022, year 7 will be part of high school and primary schools will be R–6.

A–E (GP) 

 Ardtornish Primary School, St Agnes 
 Athelstone Primary School
 Avenues College
 Banksia Park Primary School
 Beachport Primary School
 Belair Primary School 
 Bellevue Heights Primary School 
 Black Forest Primary School
 Blackwood Primary School
 Blair Athol Primary School
 Bordertown Primary School
 Braeview Primary School
 Burnside Primary School
 Campbelltown Primary School
 Challa Gardens Primary School
 Clapham Primary School
 Clovelly Park Primary School
 Colonel Light Gardens Primary School
 Compton Primary School, Suttontown
 Coonalpyn Primary School
 Coorara Primary School
 Cowandilla Primary School
 Craigburn Primary School
 Craigmore South Primary School
 Dernancourt Junior Primary School
 Dernancourt Primary School
 East Adelaide School
 East Marden Primary School
 East Para Primary School
 East Torrens Primary School
 Eden Hills Primary School
 Edwardstown Primary School

F–J (GP) 

 Fairview Park Primary School
 Ferryden Park Primary School
 Flagstaff Hill Primary School
 Forbes Primary School
 Frances Primary School
 Fraser Park Primary School
 Fulham Primary School
 Fulham North Primary School
 Fulham Gardens Primary School
 Gawler Primary School
 Gawler East Primary School
 Gilles Plains Primary School
 Gilles Street Primary School
 Glenburnie Primary School
 Glencoe Central Primary School
 Glenelg Primary School
 Golden Grove Primary School
 Goodwood Primary School
 Grange Schools
 Greenwith Primary School
 Greenock Primary School
 Gulfview Heights Primary School
 Hallett Cove East Primary School
 Hallett Cove South Primary School
 Hamley Bridge Primary School
 Hampstead Primary School
 Happy Valley School, Primary and Junior Primary schools
 Hendon Primary School
 Highbury Primary School
 Highgate School
 Hillcrest Primary School
 Hincks Avenue Primary School
 Houghton Primary School
 Hawthorndene Primary School
 Jervois Primary School
 John Hartley School

K–O (GP) 

 Kangarilla Primary School,
44 McLaren Flat Road, Kangarilla 
 Kalangadoo Primary School 
 Karrendi Primary School, Parafield Gardens
 Keithcot Farm Primary School
 Kidman Park Primary School
 Kilkenny Primary School 
 Klemzig Primary School
 Kongorong Primary School and Child Parent Centre 
 Lefevre Peninsula Primary School, Birkenhead
 Linden Park Primary School
 Lockleys North Primary School
 Loxton North School
 Madison Park Primary School
 Magill Primary School
 Mansfield Park Primary School
 McDonald Park School, Mount Gambier
 Melaleuca Park Primary School, Mount Gambier
 Melrose Primary School
 Mil Lel Primary School 
 Millicent North Primary School 
 Mitcham Primary School
 Moana Primary School
 Modbury Primary School
 Modbury South Primary School
 Modbury West Primary School
 Monash Primary School
 Morphett Vale East Primary School
 Mount Gambier North R-7 School
 Mulga Street Primary School, Mount Gambier
 Mundulla Primary School
 Murray Bridge North Primary School
 Murray Bridge South Primary School
 Mypolonga Primary School
 Nailsworth Primary School
 Nangwarry Primary School
 Naracoorte North Primary School
 Naracoorte South Primary School
 Newbery Park Primary School, Millicent
 North Adelaide Primary School
 Northfield Primary School
 North Ingle Primary School
 North Haven School
 Norwood Primary School
 One Tree Hill Primary School

P–T (GP) 

 Padthaway Primary School
 Para Hills Junior Primary School
 Para Hills Primary School
 Para Vista Primary School
 Paracombe Primary School
 Playford Primary School
 Paradise Primary School
 Parafield Gardens High School
 Parafield Gardens R-7 School
 Paringa Park Primary School
 Parkside Primary School
 Penola Primary School
 Pimpala Primary School
 The Pines School
 Pinnaroo Primary School
 Port Noarlunga Primary School
 Port Pirie West Primary School
 Prospect Primary School
 Redwood Park Primary School
 Reidy Park Primary School
 Rendelsham Primary School
 Reynella Primary School
 Reynella South School
 Riverton Primary School
 Richmond Primary School
 Ridgehaven Primary School
 Risdon Park Primary School, Port Pirie
 Risdon Park High School (closed 1994)
 Riverton Primary School
 Robe Primary School
 Rose Park Primary School
 Salisbury Heights Primary School
 Seaford Primary School
 Seaford Rise Primary School
 Semaphore Park Primary School
 Settlers Farm Junior Primary School
 Seacliff Primary School
 Solomontown Primary School, Port Pirie
 South Downs Primary School
 St Agnes' Primary School
 Stirling East Primary School
 Stradbroke Primary School
 Sturt Street Community School – Primary School
 Surrey Downs Primary School
 Suttontown Primary School, Mount Gambier
 Tailem Bend Primary School
 Tantanoola Primary School
 Tea Tree Gully Primary School
 Thorndon Park Primary School
 Torrensville Primary School
 Trinity Gardens Primary School, a school with Mainstream, Steiner, and Special Education classes.

U–Z (GP) 

 Ulebury School (1856–1871, Cornishman's Hill Road, One Tree Hill (now Ulebury), renamed to One Tree Hill Primary School, 1946)
 Unley Primary School
 Uraidla Primary School
 Vale Park Primary School
 Victor Harbor Primary School
 Walkerville Primary School
 Wandana Primary School
 West Lakes Shore School
 Westbourne Park Primary School
 Woodcroft Primary School
 Woodend Primary School, Sheidow Park
 Woodville Primary School
 Wynn Vale Primary School
 Woodville Gardens School
 Yahl Primary School

Government Secondary Schools 
Secondary schools (7–12), operated by the South Australian government. From 2022, year 7 will be part of high school.

A–E (G) 
 Aberfoyle Park High School, a special interest high school focusing on Ignite: Students with High Intellectual Potential
 Adelaide Botanic High School, a special interest high school focusing on Science, Technology, Engineering and Mathematics (STEM)
 Adelaide High School, a special interest high school focusing on Language
 Adelaide Secondary School of English, West Croydon 
 Australian Science and Mathematics School, a special interest high school focusing on Science and Mathematics
 Avenues College, a B to 12 school previously named Windsor Gardens Secondary College
 Balaklava High School
 Banksia Park International High School
 Birdwood High School
 Blackwood High School, a special interest high school focusing on Netball
 Bordertown High School
 Brighton Secondary School, a special interest high school focusing on Music and Volleyball
 Booleroo Centre District School
 Burra Community School
 Charles Campbell Secondary School, Paradise, a special interest high school focusing on Dance/Drama
 Christies Beach High School
 Clare High School
 Cleve Area School
 Coomandook Area School
 Cowell Area School, an R–12 school focusing on Aquaculture
 Craigmore High School, Blakeview 
 Croydon High School (closed 2006)
 Cummins Area School
 Eastern Fleurieu School
 Edward John Eyre High School, Whyalla
 Enfield High School became Roma Mitchell Secondary College

F–J (G) 
 Findon High School
 Gawler and District College (B–12) 
 Roma Mitchell Secondary College (Previously named Gepps Cross Girls High School))
 Gepps Cross Senior School became Roma Mitchell Secondary College
 Gladstone High School
 Glenunga International High School, a special interest high school focusing on Ignite: Students with High Intellectual Potential
 Glossop High School, a special interest high school focusing on academic achievement and vocational studies
 Golden Grove High School, a special interest high school focusing on Dance/Drama
 Grant High School (Mount Gambier) 
 Hallett Cove School (R–12)
 Hamilton Secondary College, Mitchell Park 
 Heathfield High School, a special interest high school focusing on Volleyball
 Henley High School, a special interest high school focusing on Sport and Physical Education
 Jamestown Community School (R–12) 
 John Pirie Secondary School, Port Pirie

K–O (G) 
 Kadina Memorial High School
 Karcultaby Area School
 Karoonda Area School
 Keith Area School
 Kingston Community School
 Lameroo Regional Community School 
 Le Fevre High School
 Leigh Creek Area School 
 Loxton High School
 Lucindale Area School
 Mannum Community College
 Marden Senior College
 Mark Oliphant College, Munno Para West 
 Marryatville High School, a special interest high school focusing on Music and Tennis
 Meningie Area School
 Mitcham Girls High School
 Modbury High School
 Mount Barker High School
 Mount Gambier High School
 Morphett Vale High School
 Nailsworth High School – became Ross Smith Secondary School which became Roma Mitchell Secondary College
 Murray Bridge High School
 Naracoorte High School
 Northfield High School – became Ross Smith Secondary School which became Roma Mitchell Secondary College
 Norwood Morialta High School
 Nuriootpa High School
 Ocean View P-12 College, Taperoo 
 Orroroo Area School

P–T (G) 
 Para Hills High School
 Parafield Gardens High School
 Paralowie R-12 School
 Penola High School
 Playford International College, a special interest high school focusing on Music (formerly Fremont–Elizabeth City High School)
 Port Augusta Secondary School
 Plympton International College
 Quorn Area School
 Port Lincoln High School
 Renmark High School
 Reynella East College
 Riverton & Districts High School
 Roma Mitchell Secondary College, Gepps Cross
 Ross Smith Secondary School, Northfield, became Roma Mitchell Secondary College
 Salisbury East High School
 Salisbury High School 
 Seaford Secondary College
 Seaton High School, a special interest high school focusing on Baseball
 Seaview High School, a special interest high school focusing on Tennis
 Snowtown Area School
 Springbank Secondary College, a special interest high school focusing on basketball. (Previously Pasadena High School)
 Streaky Bay Area School
 Stuart High School (Whyalla)
 Swan Reach Area School
 Thebarton Senior College
 Tintinara Area School
 The Heights School, Modbury Heights, a special interest high school focusing on Ignite: Students with High Intellectual Potential

U–Z (G) 
 Underdale High School, a special interest high school focusing on Soccer
 Unley High School
 Urrbrae Agricultural High School, a special interest high school focusing on Agriculture
 Valley View Secondary School
 Victor Harbor High School
 Waikerie High School
 Whyalla High School
 Willunga High School
 Wirreanda High School, a special interest high school focusing on Sport and Physical Education
 Woodville High School, a special interest high school focusing on Music
 Wudinna Area School
 Yankalilla Area School

Non Government Schools

Catholic Primary Schools 
 All Saints' Catholic Primary School, Seaford 
 Antonio Catholic School, Morphett Vale
 Catherine McAuley School, Craigmore
 Christ the King School, Warradale 
 Dominican School, Semaphore
 Emmaus Catholic School, Woodcroft
 Holy Family Catholic School, Parafield Gardens
 Immaculate Heart of Mary School, Brompton
 Mary MacKillop Memorial School, Penola
 McAuley Community School, Hove
 Our Lady of Grace School, Glengowrie
 Our Lady of Hope School, Greenwith
 Our Lady of Mount Carmel School, Pennington
 Our Lady of the River School, Berri
 Our Lady of the Visitation School, Taperoo
 Our Lady Queen of Peace School, Albert Park
 Rosary School, Prospect
 School of the Nativity, Aberfoyle Park
 St Albert's School, Loxton
 St Anthony’s Primary School, Millicent
 St Anthony’s School, Edwardstown
 St Augustine's Parish School, Salisbury
 St Bernadette's School, St Marys
 St Brigid's School, Evanston
 St Brigid's School, Kilburn
 St Catherine's School, Stirling
 St Columba’s Memorial School, Yorketown
 St David's Parish School, Tea Tree Gully
 St Francis of Assisi School, Newtown
 St Francis School, Lockleys
 St Francis Xavier's Catholic School, Wynn Vale
 St Gabriel's School, Enfield
 St James School, Jamestown
 St John Bosco School, Brooklyn Park
 St John the Apostle School, Christies Beach
 St John the Baptist Catholic School, Plympton
 St Joseph's Memorial School, Kensington and Norwood 
 St Joseph’s School, Gladstone
 St Joseph’s School, Barmera
 St Joseph’s School, Clare
 St Joseph's School, Hectorville
 St Joseph's School, Kingswood
 St Joseph's School, Murray Bridge
 St Joseph's School, Ottoway
 St Joseph's School, Payneham
 St Joseph's School, Peterborough
 St Joseph's School, Renmark
 St Joseph's School, Tranmere
 St Joseph's School, West Hindmarsh
 St Margaret Mary's Croydon Park
 St Martin de Porres, Adelaide, Sheidow Park
 St Martin's Primary School, Greenacres
 St Mary Mackillop School, Wallaroo
 St Mary Magdalene's School, Elizabeth Grove
 St Mary's Memorial School, Glenelg
 St Monica's Parish School, Walkerville
 St Patrick's School, Mansfield Park
 St Pius X School, Windsor Gardens
 St Raphael's School, Parkside
 St Teresa's Primary School, Colonel Light Gardens
 St Thomas More School, Elizabeth Park
 St Thomas' School, Goodwood
 Star of the Sea School, Henley Beach
 Stella Maris Parish School, Seacombe Gardens
 Tenison Woods Catholic School, Richmond
 Whitefriars School, Woodville Park

Catholic Secondary and R–12 Schools 
 Blackfriars Priory School, Prospect (R–12, Boys)
 Cabra Dominican College, Cumberland Park (7–12)
 Cardijn College, Noarlunga Downs (R–12)
 Caritas College, Port Augusta (R–12)
 Christian Brothers College, Adelaide (R–12, Boys)
 Gleeson College, Golden Grove (7–12)
 Kildare College, Holden Hill (7–12, Girls)
 Loreto College, Marryatville (R–12, Girls)
 Mary MacKillop College, Kensington (7–12, Girls)
 Mercedes College, Springfield (R–12)
 Mount Carmel College, Rosewater (7–12)
 Nazareth Catholic College, Flinders Park and Findon (R–12)
 Our Lady of La Vang School, Flinders Park (Special School, R–12)
 Our Lady of the Sacred Heart College, Enfield (7-12, Girls)
 Rostrevor College, Woodforde (R–12, Boys)
 Sacred Heart College Senior, Somerton Park (10–12)
 Sacred Heart College Middle School, Mitchell Park (7–9)
 Samaritan College, Whyalla (R–12)
 St Aloysius College, Adelaide (R–12, Girls)
 St Barbara’s Parish School, Roxby Downs (R–9)
 St Columba College, Andrews Farm (joint Catholic and Anglican) (R–12)
 St Dominic's Priory College, North Adelaide (R–12, Girls)
 St Francis de Sales College, Mount Barker (R–12)
 St Ignatius College, Norwood and Athelstone (R–12)
 St Joseph’s Education Centre, Enfield (8–12, Girls, Alternative)
 St Joseph's School, Port Lincoln (R–12)
 St Mark's College, Port Pirie (R–12)
 St Mary's College, Adelaide (R–12, Girls)
 St Michael's College, Beverley and Henley Beach (R–12)
 St Patrick's Special School, Dulwich (Special School, R–12)
 St Patrick's Technical College, Edinburgh North (10–12)
 St Paul's College, Gilles Plains (R–12)
 Tenison Woods College, Mount Gambier (R–12)
 Thomas More College, Salisbury Downs (7–12)
 Western Technical College, Rosewater (10–12)
 Xavier College, Gawler (R–12)

Independent Schools 

 Annesley Junior School, Wayville (Uniting Church, R–6)
 Aspect Treetop School, Ashford (Special School, R–10)
 Australian Islamic College Adelaide, West Croydon (Islamic, R–12)
 Bethany Christian School, Paralowie (Pentecostal Christian, R–6)
 Blakes Crossing Christian College, Blakeview (Christian, R–8)
 Calvary Lutheran Primary School, Morphett Vale (Lutheran, R–7)
 Cedar College, Northgate (Baptist, R–12)
 Concordia College, Highgate (Lutheran, R–12)
 Cornerstone College, Mount Barker (Lutheran, 7–12)
 Crossways Lutheran School, Ceduna (Lutheran, R–10)
 Dara School, Morphettville (Non-Denominational, 1–12)
 Dominio Servite College, Mt Torrens (Christian, R–12)
 Emmaus Christian College, South Plympton (Christian, R–12)
 Encounter Lutheran College, Victor Harbor (Lutheran, R–12)
 Endeavour College, Mawson Lakes (Lutheran, 7–12)
 Eynesbury Senior College, Adelaide (Non-denominational, 10–12)
 Faith Lutheran College, Tanunda (Lutheran, R–12)
 Garden College, Parafield Gardens (Islamic, R–12)
 Golden Grove Lutheran Primary School, Wynn Vale (Lutheran, R–6) 
 Good Shepherd Lutheran School, Angaston (Lutheran, R–7)
 Good Shepherd Lutheran School, Para Vista (Lutheran, R–6)
 Harvest Christian School, Kadina (Christian, R–12)
 Heritage College, Oakden (Christadelphian, R–12)
 The Hills Christian Community School, Verdun (Christian, R–12)
 The Hills Montessori School, Aldgate (Montessori, R–10)
 Hope Christian College, Craigmore (formerly Craigmore Christian School) (Christian, R–12)
 Horizon Christian School, Balaklava (Multi denominational, R–12)
 Immanuel College, Novar Gardens (Lutheran, 7–12)
 Immanuel Lutheran Primary School, Novar Gardens (Lutheran, R–6)
 Immanuel Lutheran School, Gawler (Lutheran, R–7)
 Indie School, Elizabeth (Alternative, 9–12)
 Investigator College, Victor Harbor (Anglican, R–12)
 IQRA College, O’Halloran Hill (Islamic, R–12)
 King's Baptist Grammar School, Wynn Vale (Baptist, R–12)
 Lobethal Lutheran School, Lobethal (Lutheran, R–7)
 Loxton Lutheran School, Loxton (Lutheran, R–7)
 Maitland Lutheran School, Maitland (Lutheran, R–9)
 Mid North Christian College, Port Pirie (Christian, R–12)
 Mount Barker Waldorf School, Mount Barker (Steiner, R–12)
 Muirden Senior Secondary College, Adelaide (Non-denominational, 11–12)
 Navigator College, Port Lincoln (Lutheran, R–12)
 OneSchool Global SA, Aberfoyle Park and Mt Gambier (Christian, 3–12)
 Our Saviour Lutheran School, Aberfoyle Park (Lutheran, R–7)
 Pedare Christian College, Golden Grove (Uniting Church and Anglican, R–12)
 Pembroke School, Kensington Park (Non-denominational, R–12)
 Pilgrim School, Aberfoyle Park (Uniting Church, R–7)
 Pinnacle College, Golden Grove and Elizabeth (Non-denominational, R–12)
 Playford College, Elizabeth (Islamic, R–11)
 Portside Christian College, New Port (Christian, R–12)
 Prescott College, Prospect, Para Vista and Morphett Vale (Seventh-day Adventist, R–12)
 Prince Alfred College, Kent Town (Uniting Church, Boys R–12)
 Pulteney Grammar School, Adelaide, (Anglican, R–12)
 Redeemer Lutheran School, Nurioopta (Lutheran, R–7)
 Rivergum Christian College, Glossop (Christian, R–12)
 Salisbury Lutheran Kindergarten, Salisbury (Lutheran)
 Scotch College, Torrens Park (Uniting Church, R–12)
 Seaview Christian College, Port Augusta (Christian R–7)
 SEDA College SA, Dullwich (Non-denominational, 11–12)
 Seymour College, Glen Osmond (Uniting Church, Girls R–12)
 Southern Montessori School, O’Sullivan Beach (Montessori, R–9)
 Southern Vales Christian College, Morphett Vale and Aldinga (Christian, R–12)
 Specialised Assistance School for Youth, Adelaide (Alternative, 8–12)
 St Andrew's School, Walkerville (Anglican, R–7) 
 St Columba College, Andrews Farm (Anglican and Catholic, R–12)
 St George College, Mile End (Greek Orthodox, R–12)
 St Jakobi Lutheran School, Lyndoch (Lutheran, R–7)
 St John's Lutheran School, Eudunda (Lutheran, R–7)
 St John's Grammar School, Belair (Anglican, R–12)
 St Mark's Lutheran School, Mount Barker (Lutheran, R–6)
 St Martins Lutheran College, Mount Gambier (Lutheran, R–12)
 St Michael's Lutheran School, Hahndorf (Lutheran, R–7)
 St Paul Lutheran School, Blair Athol (Lutheran, R–6)
 St Peter's College, Hackney (Anglican, Boys R–12)
 St Peter's Collegiate Girls' School, Stonyfell (Anglican, Girls R–12)
 St Peter’s Lutheran School, Blackwood (Lutheran, R–7)
 St Peter's Woodlands Grammar School, Glenelg (Anglican, R–7)
 Saint Spyridon College, Unley (Greek Orthodox, R–7)
 Suneden Specialist School, Mitchell Park (Special School, R–12)
 Sunrise Christian School (Pentecostal Christian, R–12)
 Tatachilla Lutheran College, Tatachilla (Lutheran, R–12)
 Temple Christian College, Mile End & Paralowie (Pentecostal Christian, 7–12)
 Torrens Valley Christian School, Hope Valley (Christian, R–12)
 Trinity College, Gawler, (Anglican, R–12)
 Tyndale Christian School, Salisbury East (Christian, R–12)
 Unity College, Murray Bridge (Lutheran, R–12)
 University Senior College, Adelaide (Non-denominational, 10–12)
 Vineyard Lutheran School, Clare (Lutheran, R–7)
 Waikerie Lutheran Primary School, Walkerrie (Lutheran, R–7)
 Walford Anglican School for Girls, Hyde Park (Anglican, Girls R–12)
 Westminster School, Marion Park (Uniting Church, R–12)
 Wilderness School, Medindie (Non-denominational, Girls R–12)
 Willunga Waldorf School, Willunga (Steiner, R–12)
 Woodcroft College, Morphett Vale (Anglican, R–12)
 Youth Inc, Adelaide (Alternative, Ages 17–24)
 Zion Preschool, Gawler (Christian, Preschool)

Defunct Non Government Schools 
 Cardinia Catholic School, amalgamated in 2007 to become Nazareth Catholic College
 Kirinari Community School, Unley 
 Marbury School, Aldgate
 Marymount College, Adelaide, Became part of Sacred Heart College in 2019
 Mater Christi School, amalgamated in 2007 to become Nazareth Catholic College
 Methodist Ladies' College became Annesley College in 1977, Now Annesley Junior School 
 Murraylands Christian College/Murray Bridge Christian College, became part of Tyndale Christian School in 2015
 Our Lady Help of Christians School, amalgamated in 2008 to become Samaritan College
 Our Lady of the Manger School, amalgamated in 2007 to become Nazareth Catholic College
 Presbyterian Girls' College became Seymour College in 1977 
 Siena College, Adelaide, amalgamated in 2007 to become Nazareth Catholic College
 St Ann's Special School
 Spring Head Lutheran School, Mt Torrens, closed 2017
 St John's Lutheran Primary School, Highgate, now part of Concordia College, Highgate
 St John's College, Whyalla, amalgamated in 2008 to become Samaritan College
 St. Sava Serbian Orthodox School, Adelaide (Serbian Orthodox)
 St Therese School, amalgamated in 2008 to become Samaritan College
 Tanunda Lutheran School, now part of Faith Lutheran College
 Woodlands CEGGS, now known as St Peter's Woodlands Grammar School

See also 
 List of schools in Australia
 Special interest high schools in South Australia

References

External links 
 Find a service, government preschool or school in South Australia, sa.gov.au
 Education, skills and learning information, sa.gov.au
 Department for Education and Child Development, South Australia
 The Association of Independent Schools, South Australia
 Find a Catholic School
 Lutheran Education in Australia
 Special Interest High Schools

 
South Australia-related lists